Athletes from East Germany (German Democratic Republic; GDR) and West Germany (Federal Republic of Germany; FRG) competed together as the United Team of Germany at the 1964 Winter Olympics in Innsbruck, Austria.

Medalists

Alpine skiing

Men

Men's slalom

Women

Biathlon

Men

 1 Two minutes added per miss.

Bobsleigh

Cross-country skiing

Men

Men's 4 × 10 km relay

Women

Women's 3 x 5 km relay

Figure skating

Men

Women

Pairs

 1 Pairs silver medalists Marika Kilius and Hans-Jürgen Bäumler were stripped of their silver medals in 1966 because it had been found out that they had signed professional contracts before the Olympics. At the time, only amateurs could compete in the Olympic Games. Although they were reawarded the medal in 1987, many official results lists have removed them entirely.

Ice hockey

First round
Winners (in bold) qualified for the Group A to play for 1st-8th places. Teams, which lost their qualification matches, played in Group B for 9th-16th places.

|}

Medal Round 

Czechoslovakia 11-1 Germany
USA 8-0 Germany
Canada 4-2 Germany
Sweden 10-2 Germany
USSR 10-0 Germany
Germany 6-5 Switzerland
Germany 2-1 Finland

Luge

Men

(Men's) Doubles

Women

Nordic combined 

Events:
 normal hill ski jumping 
 15 km cross-country skiing

Ski jumping

Speed skating

Men

Women

References
Official Olympic Reports
International Olympic Committee results database
 Olympic Winter Games 1964, full results by sports-reference.com

Nations at the 1964 Winter Olympics
1964
Winter Olympics